A dashboard (also called dash, instrument panel (IP), or fascia) is a control panel set within the central console of a vehicle or small aircraft. Usually located directly ahead of the driver (or pilot), it displays instrumentation and controls for the vehicle's operation. An electronic equivalent may be called an electronic instrument cluster, digital instrument panel, digital dash, digital speedometer or digital instrument cluster.

Etymology

Originally, the word dashboard applied to a barrier of wood or leather fixed at the front of a horse-drawn carriage or sleigh to protect the driver from mud or other debris "dashed up" (thrown up) by the horses' hooves. The first known use of the term (hyphenated as dash-board, and applied to sleighs) dates from 1847. Commonly these boards did not perform any additional function other than providing a convenient handhold for ascending into the driver's seat, or a small clip with which to secure the reins when not in use.

When the first "horseless carriages" were constructed in the late 19th century, with engines mounted beneath the driver such as the Daimler Stahlradwagen, the simple dashboard was retained to protect occupants from debris thrown up by the cars' front wheels. However, as car design evolved to position the motor in front of the driver, the dashboard became a panel that protected vehicle occupants from the heat and oil of the engine. With gradually increasing mechanical complexity, this panel formed a convenient location for the placement of gauges and minor controls, and from this evolved the modern instrument panel, although retaining its archaic common name.

The first mass-produced automobile, the Oldsmobile Curved Dash, got its name from its dashboard, which was curved like that of a sleigh.

Dashboard features

Where the dashboard originally included an array of simple controls (e.g., the steering wheel) and instrumentation to show speed, fuel level and oil pressure, the modern dashboard may accommodate a broad array of gauges, and controls as well as information, climate control and entertainment systems.

Contemporary dashboards may include the speedometer, tachometer, odometer, engine coolant temperature gauge, and fuel gauge, turn indicators, gearshift position indicator, seat belt warning light, parking-brake warning light, and engine-malfunction lights.  Heavy vehicles that feature air brakes, such as trucks and buses will also have gauges to indicate the available air pressure in the braking system.  Other features may include a gauge for alternator voltage, indicators for low fuel, low oil pressure, low tire pressure and faults in the airbag (SRS) systems, glove compartment, ashtray and a cigarette lighter or power outletas well as heating and ventilation systems, lighting controls, safety systems, entertainment equipment and information systems, e.g., navigation systems.

Padding and safety
In 1937, Chrysler, Dodge, DeSoto, and Plymouth cars came with a safety dashboard that was flat, raised above knee height, and had all the controls mounted flush.

Padded dashboards were advocated in the 1930s by car safety pioneer Claire L. Straith. In 1948, the Tucker 48 became the first car with a padded dashboard.

One of the safety enhancements of the 1970s was the widespread adoption of padded dashboards. The padding is commonly polyurethane foam, while the surface is commonly either polyvinyl chloride (PVC) or leather in the case of luxury models.

In the early and mid-1990s, airbags became a standard feature of steering wheels and dashboards.

Fashion in instrumentation

In the 1940s through the 1960s, American car manufacturers and their imitators designed aesthetically shaped instruments on a dashboard accented with chrome and transparent plastic, which could be less readable, but was often thought to be more stylish. Sunlight could cause a bright glare on the chrome, particularly for a convertible.  On North American vehicles in particular,  this trend lingered on until the late-1980s, which still featured dashboards with wood and fake chrome embellishment along with square instruments - long after European and Japanese manufacturers had long embraced a plainer, more functional and austere approach for dashboard and instrument panel design.

With the advent of the VFD, LED and LCD in consumer electronics, some manufacturers used instruments with digital readouts to make their cars appear more up to date. Some cars use a head-up display to project the speed of the car onto the windscreen in imitation of fighter aircraft, but in a far less complex display.

In recent years, spurred on by the growing aftermarket use of dash kits, many automakers have taken the initiative to add more stylistic elements to their dashboards. One prominent example of this is the Chevrolet Sonic which offers both exterior (e.g., a custom graphics package) and interior cosmetic upgrades. In addition to OEM dashboard trim and upgrades a number of companies offer domed polyurethane  or vinyl applique dash trim accent kits or "dash kits".

Manufacturers such as BMW, Honda, Toyota and Mercedes-Benz have included fuel-economy gauges in some instrument clusters, showing fuel mileage in real time, which was limited mainly to luxury vehicles and later, hybrids. Following a focus on increasing fuel economy in the late 2000s along with increased technology, most vehicles in the 2010s now come with either real-time or average mileage readouts on their dashboards.  The ammeter was the gauge of choice for monitoring the state of the charging system until the 1970s. Later it was replaced by the voltmeter. Today most family vehicles have warning lights instead of voltmeters or oil pressure gauges in their dashboard instrument clusters, though sports cars often have proper gauges for performance purposes and driver appeasement along with larger trucks, mainly to monitor system function during heavy usage such as towing or off-road usage.

Electronic instrument cluster

In an automobile, an electronic instrument cluster, digital instrument panel or digital dash for short, is a set of instrumentation, including the speedometer, that is displayed with a digital readout rather than with the traditional analog gauges. Many refer to it either simply as a digital speedometer or a digital instrument cluster.

History

The first application of an electronic instrument cluster, in a production automobile, was in the 1976 Aston Martin Lagonda. The first American manufacturer application was the 1978 Cadillac Seville with available Cadillac Trip Computer. In the United States they were an option in many motor vehicles manufactured in the 1980s and 1990s, and were standard on some luxury vehicles at times, including some models made by Cadillac, Chrysler and Lincoln. They included not only a speedometer with a digital readout, but also a trip computer that displayed factors like the outdoor temperature, travel direction, fuel economy and distance to empty (DTE). In 1983, the Renault 11 Electronic was the first European hatchback to have a digital dashboard. Many vehicles made today have an analog speedometer paired with the latter in digital form.  In the late 1980s into the early 1990s, General Motors had touch-screen CRTs with features such as date books and hands-free cell phone integration built into cars such as the Oldsmobile Toronado, Buick Riviera and Buick Reatta.

Advantages and drawbacks 
When accelerating, digital speedometers generally step through a freeze frame of whole numbers at a constant sample rate. It is as precise as the number displaced, whereas a gauged speedometer pointer could sweep through an infinite range between its major markings at 10 mph or 20 km/h intervals. The latter provides a sense of continuous acceleration albeit with less precision: a gauge reading could only be estimated to the pointer's nearest halfway point between the markings.

The first digital instrument clusters were considered to be unpopular during the years when they were widely produced, and were heavily criticized by reviewers in automotive magazines. Some of the criticism they received was as follows:
They were hard to see in the strong sunlight or other bright light
They took away the sense of continuous acceleration that is provided by an analog speedometer. 
They were expensive to repair in the event of a malfunction

As a result of these issues, digital instrument panels were phased out of vehicles throughout the 1990s, and have been replaced with traditional analog gauges in most vehicles (with notable exceptions from French manufacturers Renault and Citroën), including those from luxury divisions. However, many vehicles are made today with a standard or optional trip computer located independently from the speedometer.

Digital units received information from a variety of sensors installed throughout the engine and transmission, while traditional analog units were attached to a cable that provided information from the transmission. Modern analog displays receive information in the same manner as the digital units, with very few manufacturers still using the speedometer cable method.

In the 2000s, digital speedometers were produced in some hybrid vehicles, including the Toyota Prius and Honda Insight.

Most digital speedometers have had green numbers displayed on a dark green or black background.  The 8th and 9th generation Honda Civic have a "two-tier" instrument panel. The upper digital dashboard with white numbers against a blue screen (the latter of which changes to green according to driving habits), digital fuel and temperature gauges.  The lower dashboard has an analog tachometer and digital odometer. The 10th and present generation saw the two-tier design replaced with a single instrument panel, which in higher tiers is a fully digital and partially customizable design.

Since the mid-2010s and early 2020s, fully customizable digital instrument clusters have become popular. The modern implementation allows the driver to choose which information to project where and how in the instrument cluster, such as navigation aid, connected phone information and blind spot camera view. The customization can also reduce distraction for the driver and allow the manufacturer to use the same hardware in different models while retaining differentiation between models.

Automotive head-up displays have seen applications in several cars, augmenting analog gauges with a digital readout on the windshield glass.

LCDs 
Vehicle instruments have been augmented by software-powered display panels conveying information on display panels. Digital instruments present data in the form of numeric parameters, textual messages, or graphical gauges. Unlike the electro-mechanical instrument clusters of the past, these interactive displays are much more versatile and flexible.

Many modern motorcycles are now equipped with digital speedometers, most often these are sports bikes.

Toyota is using electronic instruments for showing the cars parameters for its Yaris/Vitz model, the car employs a vacuum fluorescent display to indicate the speed, RPM, fuel level, odometer, etc.

For the 2011 model year, Chrysler began using a common dashboard across their model line that has an integrated trip computer in addition to the analog gauges.  This trip computer can also be used to show a digital speedometer, making these hybrid digital-analog dashboards. the speedometer needle to be too wide, they are relying on the digital speedometer more than the analog gauge.

The French manufacturer Citroën, is using digital indicators as speedometer for many models in its range, including the C2, C3, C4 and C6.

High resolution displays
The 2007 Lamborghini Reventon introduced one of the first high resolution LCD displays used on a production vehicle. A trend setter that would be taken seriously by mainstream manufacturers on years to come and become a selling point of consideration during the next following decade.

The 2009 Lexus LFA was one of the first cars to utilize a modern LCD screen. Lexus claimed a digital speedometer was required since an analogue tachometer wouldn't be able to keep up with the rev changes of the car's engine. This statement however was mainly marketing-driven; there is no technical reason why an analog needle would not keep up with the (far heavier) engine itself.

The third generation Range Rover (L322) also introduced the first use and largest TFT LCD displays used on a production luxury SUV for the facelifted 2010, and end of the cycle model. A trend setter that would follow further adaptation from other manufacturers.

In 2014, Audi launched  its 'virtual cockpit' on Audi TT, and has later introduced it to several other models. The technology has been developed  together with the Finnish company Rightware, using its Kanzi software suite.

Railway applications 
Electronic instrument clusters are being increasingly common features on railway vehicles, in which individual instruments are replaced by various forms of digital readouts. Early uses of instrument clusters often employed LEDs to display analog-type or numeric readings for pressure gauges, electrical gauges, and other displays. They have been increasingly integrated with various cab signalling systems and together with the installation of multi-function displays, have simplified the cab layout and improved user interaction with the engineer.

See also 

 Air core gauge
 Binnacle
 Car audio
 Carputer
 Control panel
 Control stand
 Dashcam
 Flight instruments
 Glass cockpit
 GM Instrument Cluster Settlement
 Head unit
 Head-up display
 In car entertainment
 Saab Information Display
 Telematics
 Vehicular communication systems

References

External links 
 
 

Auto parts
Dashboard head units